The Rubio Peak Formation is a geologic formation in southwestern New Mexico. It is thought to have been deposited in the Eocene Epoch.

Description
The formation is volcanic, consisting mostly of flows of amphibole latites to pyroxene andesites and associated volcaniclastics and tuffs. The flows have a silica content of 59-63%. The appearance is highly variable, from pinkish gray to red to brown to black, with large to small phenocrysts and with glassy to fully crystalline texture. However, the chemical composition is reasonably uniform across the formation. It lies on older Tertiary intrusive rocks and is overlain and interfingers with the Sugarlump Tuff.

Oxygen isotope ratios suggest that the magma from which the formation solidified had its origin in the Earth's mantle and underwent a degree of fractional crystallization.

The formation has not been directly dated. However, the overlying Sugarlump Tuff has been radiometrically dated as 35.17±0.12 million years old, so the Rubio Peak Formation cannot be younger than this nor older than the Tertiary rocks on which it was deposited. This suggests an Eocene age for the formation.

Fossils
The formation contains Duchesnean and early Chadronian mammal fossils. These included a jaw of the brontothere Duchesneodus.

History of investigation
The formation first appears informally in a chart prepared by R.M. Hernon and coinvestigators in 1953, but was apparently first used in an unpublished paper by W.E. Elston that same year. C.H. Dane and G.O. Bachman (1961) mapped the formation throughout southwestern New Mexico and extended the definition to include some flows that appeared to be of Cretaceous age, but subsequent work has restricted the definition to flows near the type area and of Eocene to Olicocene age. The formation was assigned to the Spears Group by Steven M. Cather and coinvestigators in 1994, who excluded the volcanic units and restricted the formation to the associated volcaniclastics.

Footnotes

References
 
 
 
 
 
 
 
 
 
 

Paleogene formations of New Mexico